Streptomyces morookaensis is a bacterium species from the genus of Streptomyces which has been isolated from soil. Streptomyces morookaense produces 8-azaguanine and blasticidin S.

See also 
 List of Streptomyces species

References

Further reading

External links
Type strain of Streptomyces morookaense at BacDive -  the Bacterial Diversity Metadatabase	

morookaensis
Bacteria described in 1991